Mahayogi Gorakhnath University is a private university in Gorakhpur, Uttar Pradesh, India. It is established by the Uttar Pradesh Private Universities (Amendment) Ordinance, 2021 (U.P. Ordinance no. 4 of 2021) along with United University and F.S. University and recognised by University Grants Commission (India) under section 12(f) of its act. It is first private university in not only Gorakhpur but in whole Purvanchal region of Uttar Pradesh.

History
President Ram Nath Kovind inaugurated this university in Gorakhpur on 28 August 2021 in presence of Uttar Pradesh Governor Anandiben Patel, Chief Minister Yogi Adityanath and several other local politicians. It is 3th University in Gorakhpur after Deen Dayal Upadhyay Gorakhpur University & Madan Mohan Malaviya University of Technology and first private university in not only Gorakhpur but in whole Purvanchal region of Uttar Pradesh.

Courses
It is offering only 3 degree courses, BSc Nursing, MSc Nursing and BAMS as of now.

References

2021 establishments in Uttar Pradesh
Private universities in Uttar Pradesh
Education in Gorakhpur
Educational institutions established in 2021